Jonas Zohore Bergstedt (born 6 July 1991) is a Danish professional basketball player of Ivorian for BC Šiauliai of the Lithuanian Basketball League (LKL).

Playing career 
Bergstedt played for the ETHA Engomis (Cyprus), Nevėžis Kėdainiai (Lithuania), Okapi Aalstar (Belgium), 5 Stelle Massagno (Switzerland) and Bergamo Basket (Italy). He also played for domestic teams Horsens and the Bakken Bears.

On 30 March 2018 he signed for the Dynamic of the Basketball League of Serbia. Bergstedt left after the end of the 2017-18 season.

On 17 August 2021 he signed with Spójnia Stargard of the Polish Basketball League (PLK).

National team career 
Bergstedt represented Denmark national team at qualifiers for the EuroBasket 2015 and EuroBasket 2017. Jonas played all 26 continuous games from 2015 to 2020. Still playing on the Danish National team to present day.

See also 
 List of foreign basketball players in Serbia

References

External links 
 Player Profile at eurobasket.com
 Player Profile at realgm.com

1991 births
Living people
Basketball League of Serbia players
BC Šiauliai players
Centers (basketball)
Danish expatriate basketball people in Italy
Danish expatriate basketball people in Serbia
Danish expatriate basketball people in Spain
Danish expatriate sportspeople in Switzerland
Danish men's basketball players
Danish people of Ivorian descent
Expatriate basketball people in Lithuania
Expatriate basketball people in Switzerland
Hørsholm 79ers players
KK Dynamic players
Okapi Aalstar players
SAM Basket players
Spójnia Stargard players
Sportspeople from Copenhagen